Shuker is a surname. Notable people with the surname include:

 Abraham Shuker (1848–1909), cricketer
 Chris Shuker (born 1982), football coach and former football midfielder
 Gavin Shuker (born 1981), politician
 John Shuker (1942–2019), professional footballer
 Karl Shuker (born 1959), zoologist, cryptozoologist and author
 Lucy Shuker (born 1980), wheelchair tennis player